Pittsford Township is a civil township of Hillsdale County in the U.S. state of Michigan.  The population was 1,577 at the 2020 census.

Communities
Pittsford is an unincorporated community and census-designated place on the boundary with Jefferson Township.
The city of Hudson is adjacent to the township in Lenawee County at the junction of U.S. Highway 127 and M-34.

Geography

Major highways
 forms most of the eastern boundary of the township with Lenawee County.
 runs east–west through the center of the township.

Demographics
As of the census of 2000, there were 1,600 people, 574 households, and 455 families residing in the township. There were 611 housing units at an average density of 17.2 per square mile (6.6/km). The racial makeup of the township was 97.50% White, 0.25% African American, 0.38% Native American, 0.19% Asian, 0.75% from other races, and 0.94% from two or more races. Hispanic or Latino of any race were 1.44% of the population.

There were 574 households, out of which 36.4% had children under the age of 18 living with them, 70.0% were married couples living together, 6.3% had a female householder with no husband present, and 20.7% were non-families. 17.9% of all households were made up of individuals, and 7.7% had someone living alone who was 65 years of age or older.  The average household size was 2.75 and the average family size was 3.09.

In the township the population was spread out, with 26.6% under the age of 18, 8.1% from 18 to 24, 28.1% from 25 to 44, 23.6% from 45 to 64, and 13.6% who were 65 years of age or older.  The median age was 38 years. For every 100 females, there were 102.5 males.  For every 100 females age 18 and over, there were 97.3 males.

The median income for a household in the township was $44,539, and the median income for a family was $51,818. Males had a median income of $37,431 versus $26,302 for females. The per capita income for the township was $19,852.  About 2.6% of families and 3.7% of the population were below the poverty line, including 0.8% of those under age 18 and 10.2% of those age 65 or over.

Education
The township is served by two separate public school districts.  The western portion of the township is served by Pittsford Area Schools, while the eastern portion is served by Hudson Area Schools to the east in Hudson.

Notable people
Hugh M. Cole, historian and army officer

References

Townships in Hillsdale County, Michigan
Townships in Michigan
Populated places established in 1852
1852 establishments in Michigan